Migration and asylum policy of the European Union -  is a policy within the area of freedom, security and justice, established to develop and harmonise principles and measures used by member countries of the European Union to regulate migration processes and to manage issues concerning asylum and refugee status in the European Union, in particular in the Schengen Area.

Overview
Migration policy of the European Union has its roots in the 1951 Convention Relating to the Status of Refugees, an agreement founded on Article 14 of the Universal Declaration of Human Rights. The current legal bases for the EU's creation of a harmonised legislative framework on asylum are found in the Treaty on the Functioning of the European Union and the EU Charter of Fundamental Rights.

Current legal and organisational framework 
In order to regulate and control the high number of migrants as a result of the migration crisis in 2015, the EU annually directs its efforts to develop an effective European migration policy. One of the main principles of migration policy is the principle of solidarity, which is expressed in respect for natural human rights, in the coordination of political and social forces in solving the migration issue. The creation of a migration policy and its functioning is based on the collection of data about the current state of affairs, in particular the statistics of the number of legal and illegal migrants who have crossed the borders of the European Union. Despite the fact that migration policy is internally determined, it also serves as an international regulator because it is related to crossing state borders. Accordingly, events at the international level directly affect the development of this type of policy.

In 2020, the European Commission, at the request of the European Parliament, proposed a series of reforms to the existing system through a comprehensive approach anchored on three mainstays: 1) Efficient asylum and return procedures, 2) Solidarity and fair share of responsibility, and 3) Strengthened partnerships with third countries. The Common European Asylum System (CEAS) is now governed by five legislative instruments and one agency:

 The Asylum Procedures Directive, which establishes a common international protection procedure.
 The Receptions Conditions Directive, which ensures equal standards of reception conditions throughout the EU.
 The Qualifications Directive, which refers to who qualifies for the different statuses.
 The Dublin Regulation, which helps establish which country is responsible for the asylum application process.
 The EURODAC Regulation, an IT system established to collect, transmit, and compare fingerprints to help determine which member state is responsible.
 The European Union Agency for Asylum,

Status, rights and freedoms of refugees 
The EU complies with the 1951 Convention relating to the Status of Refugees, which is the main legislative act establishing the status and rights of refugees. According to the key provisions of the legal act, the main apparatus in the regulation of situations with refugees is the government. They are obliged to preserve the rights and freedoms of internally displaced persons and refugees, but at the same time monitor the creation of such a legal provision that is used by all foreigners who have arrived in a foreign country on a common basis

Dublin Regulation and readmission within the Schengen Area 

The European Union has a broad regulatory framework through which it distributes refugees in Europe. Currently, Dublin III regulations are being implemented revised and amended by European Union member countries in 2016. The Dublin Regulation enables a state to return an asylum seeker in the first Member State where the asylum seeker transited (so-called readmission). This provision was included to put pressure on border states in order to compel them to exercise better control on the external borders of the EU.  Landmark ruling of the European Court of Justice upheld the right of member states to return asylum seekers who crossed the EU external border to the member state in which they first arrived 'irregularly' (A.S. (European Union - Immigration - Asylum : Opinion) [2017] EUECJ C-490/16_O (8 July 2017)).

Temporary relocation mechanism for refugees according to quota 
Following an unprecedented migrant influx, EASO in 2015 proposed a relocation programme that was agreed upon to support the ‘frontline’ Member States of Italy and Greece, who were under pressure."After a proposal made by the Commission in May 2015, the Council adopted two decisions – (EU) 2015/1523 and (EU) 2015/1601 respectively – establishing a temporary relocation mechanism for 160 000 applicants in need of international protection from Greece and Italy, to be implemented over two years until September 2017."

Common European Asylum System

The EU set up, in 2011, a Common European Asylum System (CEAS) to unify minimum standards related to asylum. Since 1999, refugees entering Europe have been subject to the laws in place in accordance with the Common European Asylum System (CEAS). These laws were established to prohibit European Union Member States from sending individuals back to where they came from at risk of persecution, and to offer international protection to those who were granted refugee status through the course of the law. The latter, however, is still left up to EU Member States the discretion to establish procedures for obtaining and withdrawing international protection. Upon arrival in an EU Member State, individuals and families seeking refugee status were subjected to a comprehensive assessment of their life in their country of origin. The CEAS is tasked with assessing if an individual is truly eligible for refugee status, or if, for example, they were an economic migrant, that is, someone who emigrates solely to improve their economic status. If through this highly bureaucratized process an individual was deemed a refugee, they were subsequently granted international protection. For this status and protection to be granted, the potential danger and harm that could follow suit after a person's return to their country of origin had to be established. If Member States did not find this to be true of an individual's conditions, they are mandated under the CEAS to return said individual to the country of origin, as they had therefore been deemed an "irregular economic migrant". However, due to many migrants' lack of paperwork or documentation, it was often difficult for EU Member States to actually execute this mandate, and some "irregular economic migrants" managed to continue their journey through the EU. Twelve EU countries already have national lists of safe countries of origin.

European Union Agency for Asylum 

The reforms implemented in the aftermath of the 2015 European migrant crisis culminated in the creation of the European Union Agency for Asylum on 19 January 2022, which will promote greater convergence of the different member states asylum and reception practices and ensure that high EU-standards are the guide. The agency effectively replaced the European Asylum Support Office (EASO), which had been investigated by the European Anti-Fraud Office (OLAF) due to alleged misconduct and breaches of data protection amongst other charges.

European Border and Coast Guard Agency

The European Union's agency, titled European Border and Coast Guard Agency, provides a reserve of European border guards and technical equipment. 

The agency may purchase its own flagged vehicles. The Member States where this equipment is registered (bigger equipment such as patrol vessels, air crafts, etc.) are obliged to put it at the Agency's disposal whenever needed. This enables the Agency to rapidly deploy the necessary technical equipment in border operations. A rapid reserve pool of border guards and a technical equipment pool is at the disposal of the agency, intending to remove the shortages of staff and equipment for the Agency's operations. The Agency is able to launch joint operations, including the use of drones when necessary. The European Space Agency's earth observation system Copernicus provides the new Agency with almost real time satellite surveillance capabilities alongside the current Eurosur border surveillance system.

Frontex regularly releases reports analyzing events related to border control, irregular border crossing and different forms of cross-border crime. The general task of assessing these risks has been laid out in Frontex founding regulation, according to which the agency shall "carry out risk analyses [...] in order to provide the Community and the Member States with adequate information to allow for appropriate measures to be taken or to tackle identified threats and risks with a view to improving the integrated management of external borders". Frontex's key institution with respect to intelligence and risk assessment is its Risk Analysis Unit (RAU) and the Frontex Risk Analysis Network (FRAN), via which the Frontex staff is cooperating with security experts from the Member States.

Asylum, Migration and Integration Fund

The Asylum, Migration and Integration Fund is a funding programme managed by the Directorate-General for Migration and Home Affairs of the European Commission, which promotes the efficient management of migration flows and the implementation, strengthening and development of a common approach to asylum and immigration in the European Union. 

According to the text of the international instrument, the objectives of the Asylum, Migration and Integration Fund are listed in Article 3. These are:
 To strengthen and develop the establishment of the Common European Asylum System (CEAS).
 To promote the integration of third country nationals and to finance the relocation of unaccepted non-members. 
 Fair returns in order to stop illegal immigration.
 Increase solidarity between member countries with a proportional distribution to their exposure at migration flows.

In addition to providing funding for projects, the programme funds the activities and future development of the European Migration Network.

Efficacy
Based on the data published by UNHCR, as a result of hostilities in Syria, almost 22% of the country's population (with estimated of 4 million people) turned out to be refugees and internally displaced persons by the beginning of 2015. At the same time as a results of new EU policies, in 2017 the number of migrants has decreased – during the first quarter of 2017, number of immigrants and refugees accounted for 35% of their numbers of the first quarter of 2016. However, according to critics, the decline in migration occurred due to the fact that people in anticipation of a new EU-Turkey agreement, massively emigrated to Greece before its adoption in order to avoid migration problems after the agreement formal entry into force. In such case, new agreement would be irrelevant to the declining number of migrants.

Main issues related to EU migration policy

Socio-political issues
As a result of the crisis, fears have been increasing among the EU population, including the fear of Islamization through exerting pressure (politically or through acts of Islamic terrorism) to impose social, moral, legal as well as cultural norms of Islam at the expense of the local ones, but also the fear of a parallel society emerging along the indigenous one, in the form of  turning entire neighborhoods into so-called no-go areas resisting any forms of linguistic or cultural integration into the host society and attempting to replace the national law and its enforcement with some informal own legal norms enforced through militias. Such sentiments have arisen not only due to existence of areas like Molenbeek-Saint-Jean, but also due to a sharp increase in attacks attributed to jihadists in the European Union (their number rose from four attacks in 2014 to seventeen in 2015, while the number of people killed increased from four to 150), but also to some other events such as the 2015–16 New Year's Eve sexual assaults in Germany which were unrelated to terrorism but nevertheless shocked the public as an open and widespread demonstration by Muslim refugees of disregard for European social norms, as did also attempts by some imams in Germany to excuse such behaviour and shift the blame to the victims instead, while the ensuing (and later exposed) concerted effort of the authorities and the media to cover up the events, their extent and the ethnicity of the perpetrators, seriously undermined public trust in reporting on ethnically sensitive topics in Germany and entire EU by the mainstream media.

As an obvious consequence, some politicians attempt to capitalize on these fears, or even reinforce them, by voicing opposition against reception of migrants, under the justification that the public security and protection of the state and its citizens against Islamic terrorism in Europe must be given precedecence, but also due to economic, social, cultural and religious risk posed by uncontrolled migration. In some EU countries, right-wing extremists, previously marginalised but now reinvigorated, managed to enter the mainstream politics. On the other hand, the representatives of the European Commission and countries which support the adoption of migrants emphasize the need to fulfill international obligations, focusing on the priority of migrant security.

Fortress Europe

Therefore, the EU's actions gradually shifted during the crisis towards surveillance and securitization, and the first step in this direction was terminating the Operation Mare Nostrum in 2014 and supplanting it with the Operation Triton. By 2016, EU was already externalizing its border control through a 3 billion deal with Turkey. In 2017, the EU migration policy was tightened. At the summit held in Brussels on October 19, 2017, it was indicated that the approach of the EU Member States and institutions to ensure full control over the borders should be consolidated. Since 2017, the humanitarian NGO's carrying out search and rescue (SAR) operations have become the object of a criminalization campaign on the part of EU member states, leading to the arrest of some ship captains, as well as to the seizure of most of their vessels, provoking international criticism and accusations towards the EU for dereliction of duty regarding SAR operations. As a consequence, the EU has been blamed for numerous deaths at sea by preventing humanitarian NGOs search and rescue efforts, thus allegedly contradicting its declarations of good will towards refugees and migrants. Despite all the difficulties imposed on them, humanitarian NGOs continue to carry out SAR operations in the Mediterranean.

Another visible sign of the tightening of EU migration policy was the construction of numerous border barriers located primarily on the external borders of the Schengen Area.

Moreover, the conclusions of the European Council have indicated its readiness to respond and suppress any attempts to illegally cross the borders of EU Member States, e.g. through expulsion of asylum applicants into neighbouring countries such as Ukraine, Turkey or Russia, where the system to recognize refugee status is often faulty. Chachipe, a Roma rights organisation, has criticised EU asylum policy that denies Roma from the former Yugoslavia asylum based on the "safe country of origin" doctrine, as they face discrimination in their home countries. Credibility of such claims has, however, been highly doubtful, as the Romani people raised just four years earlier identical claims of alleged discrimination, this time by an EU member state, namely the Czech Republic, in order to abuse the Canadian asylum system, eventually causing an international visa dispute and a diplomatic rift between the two states.

Human rights have increasingly collided recently with security measures, while the EU has struggled to reconcile both. The position of national states in relation to migrants who violate public order and impose their own way of life has been becoming tougher, resulting in an inevitable side effect for all migrants having their rights restricted in general. Moreover, pessimistic forecasts have sometimes been voiced that the applicability of these restrictions, currently limited to migrants, could be only a prelude to possible wider extension aiming to make the indigenous EU population also subjected to them in the future.

Use of migrants as weapons in hybrid warfare

Following the severe deterioration in Belarus–European Union relations, Belarusian president Alexander Lukashenko threatened around July 7, 2021 to "flood" the EU with human traffickers, drug smugglers, and armed migrants. Later, Belarusian authorities and state-controlled tourist enterprises, together with some airlines operating in the Middle East, started promoting tours to Belarus by increasing the number of connections from the Middle East and giving those who bought them Belarusian visas, ostensibly for hunting purposes. Social media groups were additionally offering fraudulent advice on the rules of crossing the border to the prospective migrants, most of whom were trying to reach Germany. Those who arrived in Belarus were then given instructions about how and where to trespass the European Union (EU) border, and what to tell the border guards on the other side of the border. Migrants said that Belarus provided them with wire cutters and axes to cut through border fences and enter the EU; however, those who did not manage to cross the border were often forced to stay there by Belarusian authorities, who were accused of assaulting some migrants who failed to get across. Belarusian authorities later confirmed that the involvement of the border troops is "absolutely possible". Belarus refused to allow Polish humanitarian aid for the migrants, which would have included tents and sleeping bags.

Poland, Lithuania, and Latvia have described the crisis as hybrid warfare, calling the crisis an incident of human trafficking of migrants, waged by Belarus against the EU. The three governments declared a state of emergency and announced their decisions to build border walls on their borders with Belarus, with Poland approving an estimated €353 million in spending to build a  barrier. The EU sent additional supporting officers and patrol cars to Lithuania, and 12 EU governments stated their support for a physical barrier along the border.

Similar actions, though on a smaller scale, were organised by Turkey against Greece during the 2020 Greek–Turkish border crisis, as well as by Morocco against Spain during the 2021 Morocco–Spain border incident.

Outsourcing the asylum procedures 
The outsourcing of asylum procedures is a type of migration policy pursued by the countries of the European Union, it consists of relocating the reception and accommodation of asylum seekers and the processing of their asylum applications, in places near the borders of the EU or in countries outside the EU, from which asylum seekers originate or through which they pass. After an attempted relocation of asylum procedures in centres on the boundaries of the EU, in 2003 these policies have resulted in a proliferation of exile camps in and around the European Union, a pressure on neighbouring countries to develop systems that consider applications for asylum in their territories, and a radicalisation of antimigratory policies in neighbouring countries and within the border of the European Union.

Asylum shopping

In the jargon of European institutions, asylum shopping is the practice of refugees wanting to choose a country other than that prescribed by the regulations to apply for political asylum, to choose the one which will offer the best reception conditions, or to lodge an application in another country after being dismissed. This expression is used to treat certain asylum seekers in analogy with consumers of welfare provisions). Such definition appears in official documents, newspaper articles, analysis, etc. The main factor in refugees' choice  for their host country is the differences in laws of different Member States; some states give refugee status to the majority of applicants, while others give it to fewer than 1%. In 2017 Maria Teresa Rivera became the first woman in the world granted asylum because of being wrongly jailed for disregarding a ban on abortion; she disregarded the ban in El Salvador and was given asylum in Sweden. 

Asylum shopping is practised by 12% of asylum seekers, according to former European Commissioner for Justice Franco Frattini. The Dublin Regulation has significantly reduced extent of  this phenomenon. According to the Regulation, migrants are not able to choose the state from which they decided to apply for asylum. The regulation allows to apply for refugee status only from the country in which migrants enter first. At the same time, if there is a desire to change the country, migrants will have to return to their original point of arrival.

Disparities between Member States 

Number of accepted asylum applications in 2012

Neither the readmission system under the Dublin Regulation nor the temporary relocation mechanism for refugees according to quotas proved its worth in all countries of the European Union. 

The effect of the Dublin Regulation is a greater number of asylum applications in the border states (like Greece, Slovakia, Poland or Malta). The UNHCR asked the European Union in 2008 to not return Iraqi asylum seekers to Greece. Starting from 2015, many European countries unilaterally were closing their borders imprisoning people on the EU countries borders for additional investigations on their further moving intentions, thereby damaging the solidarity of the Schengen countries and violating the Dublin Regulation, which determines the procedure for considering applications for international protection.

In the autumn of 2015, the Czech Republic, together with Hungary, Romania and Slovakia, voted against the compulsory admission of refugees assigned according to relocation quotas. Later, under pressure from EU neighbors, authorities nevertheless agreed to comply with EU requirements. The Czech Republic were supposed to accept 2000 asylum seekers but only accepted 12. Spokesperson of the president of Czech Republic Miloš Zeman commented that: "Our country simply cannot afford to risk terrorist attacks like those that occurred in France and Germany. By accepting migrants, we would create fertile ground for barbaric attacks". In fact,  Western Europe endured the period of the deadliest attacks: the November 2015 Paris attacks (130 killed), the July 2016 Nice truck attack (86 killed), the June 2016 Atatürk Airport attack (45 killed), the March 2016 Brussels bombings (32 killed), while at the same time, the terrorist threat level in Poland was in 2015 zero, on its scale which has four levels plus the "zero level".

According to statistics for 2017, Malta and Luxembourg accepted the maximum number of migrants among all EU countries with an average of 41-46 immigrants per 1000 population. Meanwhile, the Czech Republic, Croatia, Bulgaria and Slovakia accepted less than 5 migrants per 1000 of population.

History

1985-2015
Following the adoption of the 1985 Schengen Agreement and the 1990 Schengen Convention on the elimination of internal border controls of signatory states and their subsequent incorporation into the EU legislative framework by the 1997 Amsterdam Treaty, the EU set the objective of introducing "appropriate measures" with respect to asylum in the Amsterdam Treaty, which required the Council of the European Union to adopt measures on asylum in accordance with the Geneva Convention and the Protocol Relating to the Status of Refugees by 2004, five years after the Treaty of Amsterdam entered into force.

Refugee applications in EU countries have usually reflected conflicts occurring in other parts of the world. In the 1990s, refugees from the Yugoslav Wars sought asylum in Europe in large numbers. In the 2010s, millions fled to Europe from wars in Syria, Afghanistan and Iraq.
More than 34,000 migrants and refugees have died trying to get to Europe since 1993, most often due to capsizing while trying to cross the Mediterranean and Aegean Seas.

Ostensibly to fight against fraud, most European states have engaged in more restrictive policies in the 2000s. For example, the United Kingdom passed the UK Borders Act 2007, the Netherlands passed the Aliens Act in April 2001, Italy passed the Bossi-Fini Act of July 2002, and France passed multiple different acts (such as the French Law of 24 July 2006 on immigration and integration and the French Law of 20 November 2007 on the control of immigration, integration and asylum). These measures have reduced the number of asylum seekers that are awarded the status of Refugee.

As part of the adoption on first reading of four codecision acts, between 4 May 2009 and 7 May 2009, 7 MEPS voted on what was called an asylum package. This included a proposed revision of the "reception" directive and another proposal to improve the Dublin system. The commission also proposed to revise the regulations for Eurodac (biometric database) and create a European Asylum Support Office, partially financed by funds previously granted to the European Refugee Fund, which would be responsible for assisting Member States in the management of asylum applications. doctrine, as they face discrimination in their home countries.

Changes of 2015 
The 2015 European migrant crisis, which brought with it over a million refugees escaping war, political instability, and poverty, accentuated the shortcomings of the existing system and made evident the need for reform. The unequal distribution of the bureaucratic burden amongst different member states produced situations that demonstrated that the CEAS, as it stood, was not sufficient or adequate. 

Therefore, the European Commission proposed a system of measures to improve the migration policy of the European Union. A decision was made to strengthen the EU's presence in the world. This decision was reinforced by the Action Plan to Combat Smuggling of Migrants for 2015–2020: it strengthen the stimulation of law enforcement and judicial activities, improved the collection and exchange of information on migrants, and forfeited cooperation with non-EU countries to combat illegal migration. EU enacted to block the migration route through the Western Balkans and let in Europe only those migrants and refugees, who will get there by legal routes originating in Turkey.  Thus, it was assumed that: the participating countries will forever stop the passage of migrants and refugees through their territory; strict entry control will be introduced at the external borders of the EU; Greece will receive substantial financial assistance due to acceptance of a strong migration flow, as well as an agreement will be reached with Ankara that Turkey will not allow illegal migrants across its border to Europe and will receive back migrants not allowed into the EU. Decisions on the migration crisis are formulated in the final documents of the European Council, adopted on February 18, March 7 and 18, 2016, which can be grouped in three major areas:

Firstly, the EU has provided financial and expert support, to countries that have accepted the main migration flow, in particular Greece, which will facilitate the provision of humanitarian assistance to refugees, the observance of administrative procedures for border control and the processing of asylum requests in accordance with the rules EU. Reception centers are being set up, where newly arrived migrants will pass a quick check and will be divided into those whose asylum requests can be considered, and those for whom the further path is closed. In addition, transit centers are organized to which candidates for asylum or other forms of international protection will be sent.

Secondly, the EU has concluded an agreement with Turkey, which clearly defines the rights and obligations of both parties in connection with the influx of refugees and migrants traveling through Turkey to Europe. According to this agreement, migrants who illegally arrived in Greece from Turkey will be sent back to Turkey, and Europe will accept migrants only on condition that their asylum requests are submitted and approved in Turkish territory. Also, the Turkish authorities from now are obliged to block the channels of smuggling and illegal transportation of people to Europe. Meanwhile, the EU gave the right to legal employment and education of Syrian children in Turkish schools. In exchange, European leaders agreed to pay compensation of €3 billion to Turkey in 2016–2017, expedite the abolition of visas for Turkish citizens entering the Schengen zone, and resume the stalled negotiations on Turkey's accession to the EU

Thirdly, in accordance with the obligation taken by all EU countries to return to compliance with the Schengen rules and establish strict border controls, additional resources were allocated to specialized services, including the European Border and Coast Guard Agency (Frontex), as well as the European Union Agency for Asylum (EUAA) managing the Common European Asylum System (CEAS) for persons applying for asylum.

In addition, on September 22, 2015, member states of the European Union decided to grant national quotas to refugees in Europe. This principle was developed with the aim of reducing migration pressure in countries such as Italy and Greece. The resettlement of refugees in the Schengen Area took into account such economic and demographic indicators as GDP, population, unemployment rate and the number of already considered asylum applications in countries that are members of the European Union.

Asylum for those persecuted in the European Union 
Rafał Gaweł from Poland, who had been sentenced to two years' imprisonment for alleged financial fraud, was given political asylum in Norway on 30 September 2020 on the grounds of a lack of the possibility of a fair trial, the lack of Polish authorities' control of extreme-right militias, and the criminal case against him appearing to constitute political persecution by Polish authorities. The case is widely regarded in Poland as a Norwegian retaliation for granting the refugee status by the Polish authorities in 2017 to a Norwegian woman named Silje Garmo, on the grounds of her persecution by the notorious Norwegian Child Welfare Services.

See also 
 Illegal immigration
 Immigration to Greece
 List of sovereign states and dependent territories by immigrant population
 European migrant crisis
 Free movement protocol
 Temporary Protection Directive

External links 
 European regulation "Dublin II"
 Information Report on the European policy on asylum by Thierry Mariani

References 

Immigration
European Union
Human migration